Ralph D. Semmel is an American engineer and computer scientist. He became the eighth director of the Johns Hopkins University Applied Physics Laboratory (APL) in Laurel, Maryland on July 1, 2010.

Biography 
A native of Monroe, New York, Semmel earned a Bachelor of Science degree in engineering from the United States Military Academy at West Point, a Master of Science degree in systems management from the University of Southern California, a Master of Science degree in computer science from Johns Hopkins University and a Ph.D. in computer science from the University of Maryland, Baltimore County.

Career 
Prior to joining APL, Semmel held leadership and technical positions with Wang Laboratories and the MITRE Corporation. He joined APL in 1986 after serving in the U.S. Army.

From 1997 to 2010, Semmel served as chair of the graduate programs in Computer Science, Information Assurance, and Information Systems Engineering for Johns Hopkins University’s Whiting School of Engineering’s ‘Engineering for Professionals’ program.

In 2017, Semmel was named an "International Business Leader" by the World Trade Institute. On May 24, 2019 Semmel delivered the commencement speech, and received an honorary associate of arts degree, at Howard Community College. The Daily Record recognized Semmel as an "Influential Marylander" in an issue released March 29, 2019 and as a top 30 "Power in Higher Education" in 2022.

Under Semmel's leadership, the Lab had a wide variety of accomplishments, including the successful Pluto flyby of APL-built New Horizons,  and the data modeling for the Johns Hopkins Coronavirus Research Center  and the successful Double Asteroid Redirection Test, which was the world's first planetary defense test mission. APL was also selected multiple times as one of Fast Company's Best Workplaces for Innovators  and as ComputerWorld's Top 10 Best Places to Work in I.T.

Research 
Semmel has published papers in the areas of artificial intelligence, database systems, and software engineering. His published works include research on a prototype query tool for the U.S. Army,  automated query formation using an entity-relationship conceptual schema  as well as a prototype interface that would allow better data retrieval from the Hubble Telescope.  Semmel also did research on how to include context into conceptual schema,  integrated reengineered databases to support data fusion,  knowledge-based information access  and spacecraft distributed modeling and simulation. 

While at the University of Maryland, Semmel's dissertation discussed automated query formulation.

Semmel also served as the co-chair for the Defense Science Board's task force report on Next-Generation Unmanned Undersea Systems.

References

External links
 

21st-century American engineers
University of Southern California alumni
Johns Hopkins University alumni
University of Maryland, Baltimore County alumni
Year of birth missing (living people)
Living people
American computer scientists